The Anafon River, or Afon Anafon, is a river in Gwynedd, Wales, that flows into the Afon Aber.

It originates on the slopes of Foel-fras and the Drum of the Carneddau. It flows into Glyn Anafon. then north-west along the Anafon Valley, flowing past monuments of the Iron Age and the Bronze Age. It joins with the Aber Estuary just above the New Bridge, the bridge over the river on the way to the back of Abergwyngregyn.

Rivers of Gwynedd
Snowdonia